James Irwin (1930–1991) was an Apollo 15 astronaut who walked on the Moon.

James or Jim Irwin may also refer to:
James Murray Irwin (1858–1938), British Army doctor
James Alexander Hamilton Irwin, Irish Presbyterian minister
James Campbell Irwin (1906–1990), Australian soldier and architect, Lord Mayor of Adelaide
James C. Irwin (1929–2018), United States Coast Guard admiral
Jamie Irwin (James Campbell Irwin, 1937–2005), South Australian politician
Jim Irwin (sportscaster) (1934–2012), American sportscaster in Wisconsin
James Irwin, American singer in The Voice (U.S. season 5) in 2013

See also
James Irwin Brownson (1816–1899), American Presbyterian clergyman and academic in Pennsylvania
James Irwin Hartt (1866–1935), Irish-born Canadian lumberman and political figure in Ontario